Hedgehog is a 2017 American drama film written and directed by Lindsey Copeland. The film stars Madeline Brewer, Danny Deferrari, Robbie Tann, Jessica Renee Russell, Richard Toth, and Ann Dowd. The film premiered at the 2017 Cinequest Film Festival.

Plot summary
Ali is a young comic who longs to follow in the footsteps of her once well-known father. Unfortunately for Ali, her fear of suffering the same fate as her father prevents her from ever trying her hand at comedy. In the hopes of conquering her fears, Ali begins taking writing classes but soon finds that the additional costs force her to take a second job assisting a friends neighbor, Joan, who is preparing to move out of her home.

Cast
 Madeline Brewer as Ali
 Danny Deferrari as Sean
 Robbie Tann as Kyle
 Jessica Renee Russell as Amy
 Richard Toth as Darren
 Ann Dowd as Joan

Production
Hedgehog was filmed on location in Boston, Massachusetts, in October 2015. Filming locations also included Portsmouth, New Hampshire, and Everett, Massachusetts. Filming took place over 21 days.

References

External links
 
 https://www.bostonglobe.com/arts/movies/2015/11/09/scenehere/sD4N8c6HckObpRyRhwLgBN/story.html
 https://variety.com/2015/film/news/hemlock-grove-madeline-brewer-hedgehog-1201635647/
 https://wherever-i-look.com/movies/hedgehog-summary-review-with-spoilers
 http://iffboston.org/2017-festival/ 

2017 films
2017 drama films
2017 independent films
American drama films
American independent films
Films shot in Boston
Films shot in New Hampshire
2010s English-language films
2010s American films